The 2023 Ultimate Cup Series is the fifth season of the Ultimate Cup Series. It will begin at Circuit Paul Ricard on 25 March and will end at the same venue on 12 November. The Ultimate Cup Series is a program comprising multiple endurance and sprint championships across different classes of motor racing.

Calendar
The 2023 calendar was announced on 10 October 2022. The round at Misano World Circuit Marco Simoncelli will be replaced by a round at the newly-built Circuit de Mirecourt near Nancy in eastern France, although an agreement on that round is yet to be finalized.

Endurance Prototype Challenge
The Endurance Prototype Challenge is open to LMP3, Nova Proto NP02s, Group CN cars and Proto Evo cars.

Teams and drivers

Race results
Bold indicates overall winner.

Endurance GT Touring Challenge by KENNOL
The Endurance GT Touring Challenge by KENNOL is open to GT3, GT4, single-make series (Porsche Carrera Cup, Ferrari Challenge, Lamborghini Super Trofeo), TCR cars.

Teams and drivers

Race results
Bold indicates overall winner.

Sprint GT Touring Challenge
The Sprint GT Touring Challenge is open to GT3, GT4, single-make series (Porsche Carrera Cup, Ferrari Challenge, Lamborghini Super Trofeo), TCR cars.

Teams and drivers

Race results
Bold indicates overall winner.

Challenge Monoplace
The Challenge Monoplace is open to Tatuus FR-19 cars in the F3R class, Tatuus FR2.0/13s in the FR2.0 class and Mygale M14-F4 cars in the F4 class.

Teams and drivers

Race Results

Standings

F3R standings

FR2.0 standings

References

External links

 Official website: 

Ultimate Cup Series
Ultimate Cup Series
Ultimate Cup Series
Ultimate Cup Series